Shipley may refer to:

People
Shipley (surname)

Places
in Australia
Shipley, New South Wales
in England
Shipley, Derbyshire, a village
Shipley, Northumberland, now in the parish of Eglingham
Shipley, Shropshire, a village, see List of United Kingdom locations: Sg-Sh#Shi
Shipley, West Sussex, a village
Shipley, West Yorkshire, a town, near Bradford
Shipley (UK Parliament constituency)
in USA
Shipley, Oregon

Other uses
 Shipley School, Pennsylvania prep school
 Shipley Do-Nuts, a doughnut chain in Texas
 Shipley & Halmos, New York design firm
 Shiply, a goods transportation service
 Shepley, West Yorkshire, a village, near Huddersfield